Curatella americana, commonly known as the wild cashew tree, sambaı́ba, and the sandpaper tree, is a species of tree in the family Dilleniaceae. It is the sole accepted species in genus Curatella.

Description
Curatella americana is a semi-deciduous tree with a dense, rounded crown.

Range
Curatella americana ranges through the tropical Americas, including northern South America (Brazil, Bolivia, Peru, Colombia, Venezuela, and the Guyanas), Central America from Panama to Mexico, and the western Caribbean.

Habitat
Curatella americana is generally found in savanna and dry forest habitats. In Guatemala, it is found on dry open or brushy hillsides below  elevation, or growing among pines.

Human uses
Parts of the plant, including its edible fruits and seeds, are a local source of food, traditional medicines, and other commodities. It is generally harvested from the wild, although it is sometimes planted for its fruits and seeds. It is widely grown as an ornamental plant in Central America.

References

External links
 
 

Dilleniaceae
Monotypic eudicot genera